Linda Opal Mearns is a geographer and climate scientist specializing in climate change assessment science. Mearns is a senior scientist at the National Center for Atmospheric Research (NCAR). Mearns is the director of NCAR's Weather and Climate Impacts Assessment Science Program (WCIASP) and head of the Regional Integrated Sciences Collective (RISC). Mearns is a lead principal investigator for the North American Regional Climate Change Program (NARCCAP).

Biography 
Mearns received a Doctor of Philosophy (Ph.D.) in geography at the University of California, Los Angeles (UCLA).

Mearns is an author on the Second (1995), Third (2001), Fourth (2007), Fifth (2013) and Sixth (2021) Assessment Reports of the United Nations (UN) Intergovernmental Panel on Climate Change (IPCC). Mearns is a lead principal investigator for the North American Regional Climate Change Program (NARCCAP) which uses data that Mearns was involved in generating to produce data-based climate simulations to predict future climate scenarios.

Selected publications

Books

Journal articles
 Giorgi, F. and Mearns, L. O. Approaches to the simulation of regional climate change: A review. 1991. Reviews of Geophysics 29 (2), 191.
 Bukovsky, M. S.,Thompson, J. A., Mearns, L. O. Weighting a Regional Climate Model Ensemble: Does It Make a Difference? Can It Make a Difference? 2019. Climate Research 77 (1), 23-43.
 Mearns, L. O., Katz, R. W., and Schneider, S. H. Extreme High-Temperature Events: Changes in their probabilities with Changes in Mean Temperature. 1984. Journal of Climate and Applied Meteorology 23 (12), 1601-1613.
 Giorgi, F. and Mearns, L. O. 1999. Introduction to special section: Regional Climate Modeling Revisited. Journal of Geophysical Research 104 (D6), 6335-6352.
 Easterling, D. R., Meehl, G. A., Parmesan, C., Changnon, S. A., Karl, T. R., and Mearns L. O. 2000. Climate Extremes: Observations, Modeling, and Impacts. Science 289 (5487), 2068-2074.
 Giorgi, F. and Mearns, L. O. Calculation of Average, Uncertainty Range, and Reliability of Regional Climate Changes from AOGCM Simulations via the “Reliability Ensemble Averaging” (REA) Method. 2002. Journal of Climate 15 (10), 1141-1158.
 Feddema, J. J., Oleson, K. W., Bonan G. B., Mearns L. O., Buja L. E., Meehl G. A., Washington W. M. 2005. The Importance of Land-Cover Change in Simulating Future Climates. Science 310 (5754), 1674-1678.

Awards and honors 
 2006 Fellow of the American Meteorological Society
 2016 American Association of Geographers (AAG) Distinguished Scholarship Award
 2017 recipient of the American Geophysical Union Stephen Schneider Lecture

References 

University of California, Los Angeles alumni
National Center for Atmospheric Research faculty
American climatologists
Women climatologists
Year of birth missing (living people)
Living people